Fortwilliam Park is a football ground in Tobermore, County Londonderry, Northern Ireland. It is the home ground of Tobermore United F.C.

In 1984, the ground hosted George Best's only competitive club match in Northern Ireland, when he played for Tobermore United in an Irish Cup tie against Ballymena United.

References

Association football venues in Northern Ireland
Sports venues in County Londonderry
County Londonderry